Munida acola is a species of squat lobster in the family Munididae. The species name is derived from the Greek akolos, meaning "bit", referring to its small size.

References

Squat lobsters
Crustaceans described in 2009